Wesley Erwin "Mac" Curtis, Jr. (January 16, 1939 – September 16, 2013) was an American rockabilly musician.

Biography 
Born in Fort Worth, Texas, Curtis began playing guitar at the age of 12, entering local talent competitions. In 1954, his family moved to Weatherford, Texas, and while there he formed a band with two classmates, Jim and Ken Galbraith. They played at school events, but during one of the events, their show was shut down due to sexually suggestive on-stage movements. Instead, the group played locally, and in 1955 they were offered a deal with King Records, who released their debut single, "If I Had Me a Woman".

Soon afterwards, Alan Freed heard the group and invited them to play on his Christmas radio special in 1956. Curtis returned to Weatherford to finish school in 1957, and then became a disc jockey in Seoul, Korea after joining the military. Upon his return in 1960, he continued work as a DJ in the South, and released a few albums; his 1968 release, The Sunshine Man, hit No. 35 on the U.S. Country albums chart. As rockabilly grew in popularity in the 1970s, he began recording with Ray Campi and signed to Ronnie Weiser's Rollin' Rock Records. In 1970, Mac Curtis had two hits on Billboard Hot Country Songs chart, "Early In The Morning" (#35) and "Honey, Don't" (#43). As a singer he was still active in the 1980s and 1990s. He was later elected to the Rockabilly Hall of Fame.

He died on September 16, 2013 at age 74, following injuries received in a car accident a month earlier, after which he had undergone rehabilitation at a nursing home.

Albums

Singles

Charted singles
 "The Quiet Kind" (1968) #64 C&W
 "The Sunshine Man" (1968) #54 C&W
 "Happiness Lives In This House" (1969) #63 C&W
 "Don't Make Love" (1969) #60 C&W
 "Honey, Don't" (1970) #43 C&W
 "Early In The Morning" (1970) #35 C&W

References

External links

1939 births
2013 deaths
People from Fort Worth, Texas
American rockabilly musicians
American country singer-songwriters
Singer-songwriters from Texas
Dot Records artists
King Records artists
Charay Records artists
Epic Records artists
Radar Records artists
Radio personalities from Texas
20th-century American singers
21st-century American singers
20th-century American guitarists
21st-century American guitarists
Country musicians from Texas